The Triangle Inn is a historic site in Venice, Florida. It was built in 1927, and originally used as a rooming house operated by Mrs. Augusta Miner. It is now used as a Museum and archives depository. It is located at 351 South Nassau Street. On February 23, 1996, it was added to the U.S. National Register of Historic Places.

References

External links
 Sarasota County listings at National Register of Historic Places
 Venice Archives and Area Historical Collection at Florida's Office of Cultural and Historical Programs

National Register of Historic Places in Sarasota County, Florida
Hotel buildings on the National Register of Historic Places in Florida